The Saudi Super Cup is an annual super cup football match organized by the Saudi Arabian Football Federation. Founded in 2013 as a two-team competition, the current version has been contested since 2022–23 by four teams: the winners and runners-up of the King Cup and Pro League. The competition was held the week before the season begins in Saudi Arabia from 2013 until 2018. Since the 2019 edition it has been held mid-season.

The current holders are Al-Ittihad, who defeated Al-Fayha 2–0 in the 2022 edition. The most successful team in the competition is Al-Hilal, who won the trophy three times.

History
The idea of having a super cup tournament in Saudi Arabia dates back to 1979 when a two-legged match was held between the 1978–79 Saudi Premier League winners, Al-Hilal, and the 1979 King Cup winners, Al-Ahli. The first leg, which was played in Jeddah, ended in 2–2 draw and the second leg, held in Riyadh, ended in a 4–1 win for Al-Hilal. 20 years later, another super cup match between Al-Hilal, the 1997–98 Saudi Premier League winners, and Al-Ahli, the 1997–98 Saudi Crown Prince Cup winners, was held. It was the opening match for the inaugural Saudi Founder's Cup and ended in a 5–2 win for Al-Hilal.

In 2012, Saudi Arabian Football Federation officially decided to launch the tournament following the conclusion of the 2011–12 season. The planned super cup match was set to be held between the 2011–12 Saudi Professional League winners, Al-Shabab and the 2012 King Cup of Champions winners, Al-Ahli. However, the 2012 Super Cup was canceled due to scheduling issues as no appropriate date for the match was found. The tournament was officially inaugurated in 2013 and was played by the 2012–13 Saudi Professional League winners, Al-Fateh, and 2013 King Cup of Champions winners, Al-Ittihad. Al-Fateh won the first official edition of the Saudi Super Cup after beating Al-Ittihad 3–2 after extra time. The 2014 Saudi Super Cup was the first edition to be held in Riyadh. Al-Shabab defeated Al-Nassr 4–3 on penalties in the King Fahd International Stadium. In 2015, the Super Cup was played outside of Saudi Arabia for the first time. The match was between 2014–15 Saudi Professional League winners, Al-Nassr, and 2015 King Cup winners, Al-Hilal. The match was held in Loftus Road in London and ended in 1–0 win for Al-Hilal. The next two editions were also held in London, with the 2016 edition held in Craven Cottage and the 2018 edition held once again in Loftus Road. In 2016, Al-Ahli defeated Al-Hilal 4–3 on penalties. In 2018, Al-Hilal defeated Al-Ittihad 2–1 to become the first team to win the trophy twice. The 2017 edition which was supposed to be contested between Al-Hilal and Al-Ittihad was the first edition to be canceled. The decision was based on the request of then-Saudi national team manager, Edgardo Bauza, who expressed his desire to change the calendar of the season to help him set the ideal preparation program for the 2018 FIFA World Cup. In 2019, the Saudi Super Cup was held in Jeddah for the first time. Al-Nassr defeated Al-Taawoun 5–4 on penalties in the King Abdullah Sports City to win their first title.

On 12 January 2021, the Saudi Arabian Football Federation (SAFF) and Saudi water company Berain signed a sponsorship deal for the 2020 edition. The match would officially be referred to as "The Berain Saudi Super Cup". On 30 January 2021, Al-Nassr defeated Al-Hilal 3–0 to win their second title. They became the first team to win two consecutive titles and also set the record for the biggest goal margin. On 6 January 2022, Al-Hilal defeated Al-Faisaly, who were making their debut in the competition, 4–3 on penalties to become the most successful team in the competition with three titles.

On 19 February 2022, the SAFF announced that the Saudi Super Cup would expand to four teams with the winners and runners-up of the Saudi Professional League and the King Cup taking part.

Competition rules
 League champions versus King Cup winners. If one team wins both the League and King Cup in a single season, the runner-up of the Pro League participates alongside the League winner.
 The match consists of two periods of 45 minutes each, known as halves. If the scores are level at the end of 90 minutes, a penalty shoot-out determines the winner.

Records and statistics

Finals by year

Two-team format

Four-team format

Performance by club

Performance by representative

See also 
Saudi Arabia Football Federation
Saudi Professional League
King's Cup

References

External links
 Saudi Super Cup SAFF 
 Saudi Super Cup on RSSSF

 
3
National association football supercups